King County, Washington, like many other jurisdictions, maintains a list of landmarks, as do several cities within the county. This is a list of landmarks designated by the county.

In addition, the following have the status of King County Community Landmarks:

See also

 National Register of Historic Places listings in King County, Washington
 List of landmarks in Seattle
 Auburn, Washington#City landmarks
 Black Diamond, Washington#City landmarks
 Carnation, Washington#City landmarks
 Des Moines, Washington#City landmarks
 Kenmore, Washington#Neighborhoods mentions the city landmark Charles and Elvera Thomsen House.
 Kent, Washington#City landmarks
 Kirkland, Washington#City landmarks
 Newcastle, Washington#City landmarks
 North Bend, Washington#Landmarks
 Redmond, Washington#City landmark
 Shoreline, Washington#City landmarks
 Snoqualmie, Washington#City landmarks
 Woodinville, Washington#City landmarks

Notes

References
 Unless otherwise noted, listings on this page are based on King County and City Landmarks List (Technical Paper No. 6), King County Historic Preservation Program, Department of Natural Resources and Parks, December 2018. Accessed online 2019-07-10.

 
History of King County, Washington
King County, Washington
King County, Washington